The 2023 Nigerian Senate elections in Benue State will be held on 25 February 2023, to elect the 3 federal Senators from Benue State, one from each of the state's three senatorial districts. The elections will coincide with the 2023 presidential election, as well as other elections to the Senate and elections to the House of Representatives; with state elections being held two weeks later. Primaries were held between 4 April and 9 June 2022.

Background
In the previous Senate elections, none of the three incumbent senators were returned, with longtime Senator David Mark (PDP-South) retiring whilst Barnabas Andyar Gemade (SDP-North-East) and George Akume (APC-North-West) were defeated in their re-election bids. In the South district, Patrick Abba Moro retained the seat for the PDP with 49% of the vote; the PDP gained the other two seats as Gabriel Suswam unseated Gemade with 53% in the North-East while Akume was defeated in the North-West by Emmanuel Yisa Orker-Jev with 57% of the vote. These results were a part of a wider shift back towards the PDP in Benue as PDP presidential nominee Atiku Abubakar narrowly won the state after Buhari had won it in 2015 and the PDP won seven House of Representatives seats. Similarly, Governor Samuel Ortom (PDP) won re-election by over 10% and the PDP won a majority in the House of Assembly.

Overview

Summary

Benue North-East 

The Benue North-East Senatorial District covers the local government areas of Katsina-Ala, Konshisha, Kwande, Logo, Vandeikya, Ukum, and Ushongo. The district is often referred to as "Zone A" and is also noted for its ethnic Tiv majority. The incumbent Gabriel Suswam (PDP), who was elected with 52.6% of the vote in 2019, is seeking re-election.

Primary elections

All Progressives Congress 

On the primary date, seven candidates contested a direct primary that ended with Emmanuel Memga Udende—former MHR for Katsina-Ala/Ukum/Logo—winning the nomination after results showed him defeating Terlumun Akputu by a 40% margin.

People's Democratic Party 

On the primary date, an indirect primary ended with Suswam's renomination as he was unopposed.

Campaign 
In December 2022, reporting from The Punch stated that while Udende and Suswam were the two frontrunners, Torngee Malu (LP) could obtain a significant share of the vote total.

General election

Results

Benue North-West 

The Benue North-West Senatorial District covers the local government areas of Buruku, Gboko, Gwer East, Gwer West, Guma, Makurdi, and Tarka. The district is often referred to as "Zone B" and is also noted for its ethnic Tiv majority. The incumbent Emmanuel Yisa Orker-Jev (PDP), who was elected with 56.5% of the vote in 2019, is retiring from the Senate.

Primary elections

All Progressives Congress 

On 30 May, a direct primary that ended with Titus Zam defeating two other candidates in a landslide.

People's Democratic Party 

Weeks before the primary, Orker-Jev declined to run for re-election in favour of outgoing Governor Samuel Ortom's senatorial ambition. On the primary date, Ortom was nominated unopposed at the venue in Makurdi. After the vote, Ortom thanked the people of the district and pledged to continue good representation.

Campaign
In review of the campaign in December 2022, reporting from The Nation observed regional elements to the election as Ortom's feud with PDP National Chairman Iyorchia Ayu reflected on their native communities as Ortom is a Jemgba Tiv while Ayu is a Minda Tiv. Another key factor noted was the ability of Ortom to use the power of his state government to help campaigning. In a piece later that month from The Punch, reporting indicated that Ortom had met with several Minda Tiv community leaders to gain their support while Zam had been hindered by the rising candidacy of Mark Gbillah (LP)—a MHR who, like Zam, originates from Gwer West LGA. A piece from The Africa Report in January also noted regional sentiments and Gwer West vote splitting but focused more so on the Ortom versus former Governor George Akume dynamic. An analyst claimed "Zam is Akume's candidate" and thus the election was labeled effectively a contest between Ortom and Akume.

In the fortnight prior to the election, the election came to national attention when Ortom endorsed Peter Obi in the presidential election on 17 February 2023. While it was notable as he became the first incumbent governor to endorse Obi, in terms of the senatorial election, Ortom became in danger of internal PDP sanction due to the endorsement. Despite this threat, Ortom claimed that he was "sacrifice [his] senatorial ambition" for Obi's campaign. Pundits noted the oddity of Ortom endorsing Obi while competing against Gbillah in addition to the rising popularity of APC gubernatorial nominee Hyacinth Alia.

General election

Results

Benue South 

The Benue South Senatorial District covers the local government areas of Ado, Agatu, Apa, Obi, Ogbadibo, Ohimini, Oju, Okpokwu, and Otukpo. The district is often referred to as "Zone C" and is also noted for its population of predominantly ethnic Idoma and Igede peoples. The incumbent Patrick Abba Moro (PDP), who was elected with 48.6% of the vote in 2019, is seeking re-election.

Primary elections

All Progressives Congress 

On 30 May, a direct primary that ended with activist Daniel Onjeh defeating four candidates in a landslide. In Onjeh's acceptance speech, he called on the party to unite behind him as its nominee.

People's Democratic Party 

On May 28, four candidates contested an indirect primary that ended with Moro winning renomination after results showed him defeating Hassan Anthony Saleh by a significant margin.

Campaign 
In a December 2022 campaign analysis article, The Punch labeled Moro as the frontrunner while Onjeh and Joseph Ojobo (LP) were noted as other major candidates.

General election

Results

See also 
 2023 Nigerian Senate election
 2023 Nigerian elections

References 

Benue State senatorial elections
2023 Benue State elections
Benue State Senate elections